The 2002–03 Ligat Nashim was the fifth season of women's league football under the Israeli Football Association.

League play was interrupted as the clubs went on strike in protest over discrimination in budget allocation and financial difficulties. The matter was discussed in the Knesset's Committee on the Status of Women, resulting in an agreement which allowed the completion of the 2002–03 Israeli Women's Cup and the league.

The league was won by Maccabi Holon, who had beaten Maccabi Haifa 2–1 in a play-off match.

Format changes
For this season the league was split into two regional divisions with 6 teams in each division, playing a double round-robin schedule, after which the two top teams are to meet in a play-off series. Eventually, the two top teams met for a single match to decide the championship.

League table

North division

South division

Play-off match
Maccabi Haifa and Maccabi Holon met in a single play-off match to determine the winner, Maccabi Holon winning 2–1.

References
 Women's League 2002/3 Women's Football in Israel 

Ligat Nashim seasons
1
women
Israel